Dueña de mi Corazón (English I'm the owner of my heart) is the 3rd studio album by Mexican pop singer Daniela Romo. This album was released on 1985.

History
An album produced by Danilo Vaona. It has several hits: "Abuso" (Abuse) written by Juan Gabriel, "Dueña de mi corazón" (I'm the owner of my heart). "Prometes"(You pledge) written by Victor Manuel Olivas. It also includes the track "Es nuestro amor" (It's our love) that Daniela performed at the Yamaha Music Festival  and written by Denise De Kalafe.

Track listing
Tracks:
 Abuso
 Dueña de mi corazón
 Mi perdición
 Ahora tú
 Más vale un hombre
 No puedo creer
 Lástima
 Es nuestro amor
 Prometes
 Amor con amor se paga

Singles
 Abuso
 Dueña de mi corazón
 Prometes

Album chart
This release reached the #15 position in Billboard Latin Pop Albums. 

1985 albums
Daniela Romo albums